This list needs pictures and descriptions for each snake listed to fit the goals of the Snake Project

According to a 2012 study, Georgia has 15.67 snakes per square mile, surpassing Arizona's 15.2 for the largest number in the country.

Snakes

Non-Venomous 

Worm Snake (Carphophis amoenus)

Scarlet Snake (Cemophora coccinea)

Black Racer (Coluber constrictor)

Ringneck Snake (Diadophis punctatus)

Indigo Snake (Drymarchon corais)

Corn Snake (Pantherophis guttatus)

Rat Snake (Pantherophis obsoletus)

Mud Snake (Farancia abacura)

Rainbow Snake (Farancia erytrogramma)

Eastern Hognose Snake (Heterodon platirhinos)

Southern Hognose Snake (Heterodon simus)

Mole Kingsnake (Lampropeltis calligaster)

Eastern Kingsnake (Lampropeltis getula)

Milk Snake (Lampropeltis triangulum)

Scarlet Kingsnake (Lampropeltis triangulum elapsoides)

Coachwhip (Masticophis flagellum)

Redbelly Water Snake (Nerodia erythrogaster)

Banded Water Snake (Nerodia fasciata)

Green Water Snake (Nerodia floridana)

Northern Water Snake (Nerodia sipedon)

Brown Water Snake (Nerodia taxispilota)

Rough Green Snake (Opheodrys aestivus)

Pine Snake (Pituophis melanoleucus)

Striped Crayfish Snake (Liodytes alleni)

Glossy Crayfish Snake (Regina rigida)

Queen snake (Regina septemvittata)

Pine Woods Snake (Rhadinaea flavilata)

Black Swamp Snake (Seminatrix pygaea)

Brown Snake (Storeria dekayi)

Red-bellied Snake (Storeria occipitomaculata)

Florida Brown Snake (Storeria victa)

Southeastern Crowned Snake (Tantilla coronata)

Central Florida Crowned Snake (Tantilla relicta)

Eastern Ribbon Snake (Thamnophis sauritus)

Eastern Garter Snake (Thamnophis sirtalis)

Rough Earth Snake (Virginia striatula)

Smooth Earth Snake (Virginia valeriae)

Venomous 

Vipers

Copperhead (Agkistrodon contortrix)

Cottonmouth (Water moccasin) (Agkistrodon piscivorus)

Eastern diamondback rattlesnake (Crotalus adamanteus)

Timber rattlesnake (Crotalus horridus)

Pigmy rattlesnake (Sistrurus miliarius)

Coral snakes

eastern coral snake (Micrurus fulvius)

Resources 

[ UGA.edu]

Georgia
Snakes